White Russia, White Russian, or Russian White may refer to:

White Russia
White Ruthenia,  a historical reference for a territory in the eastern part of present-day Belarus
 An archaic literal translation for Belarus/Byelorussia/Belorussia
 Russian State, opposed to the Soviet ("Red") Russia, one of the sides in the Russian Civil War

White Russian
 A member of the White movement during the Russian Civil War
 A White émigré from the Russian Civil War
 "White Russian", a song by Marillion from their 1987 album Clutching at Straws
 The White Russian, a 2003 novel by Tom Bradby
 The White Russians, an Australian band fronted by Pinky Beecroft
 White Russian (cocktail), a cocktail made with vodka, coffee liqueur and cream

Russian White
Russian White, Black, and Tabby, breeds of cat
Russian White goat

See also 
 Red Russia (disambiguation)